The 2016–17 United Arab Emirates Tri-Nation Series was a One Day International (ODI) cricket tournament that was held in the United Arab Emirates in January 2017. It was a tri-nation series between the national representative cricket teams of Hong Kong, Scotland and the United Arab Emirates. The United Arab Emirates won the series, following a six-wicket win in the final match against Hong Kong.

Squads

Points table

Matches

1st ODI

2nd ODI

3rd ODI

References

External links
 Series home at ESPN Cricinfo

2017 in Hong Kong cricket
2017 in Scottish cricket
2017 in Emirati cricket
International cricket competitions in 2016–17
International cricket competitions in the United Arab Emirates
January 2017 sports events in Asia